SteamWorld Build is an upcoming city-building dungeon crawling video game developed by The Station and published by Thunderful Publishing. An installment in the SteamWorld series, the game is set to be released for Windows PC, Nintendo Switch, PlayStation 4, PlayStation 5, Xbox One, Xbox Series X and Series S in 2023.

Gameplay
SteamWorld Build is a cross-genre video game. The first part of the game tasks the players to construct and manage a mining town on an alien planet. Players need to construct roads, infrastructure, amenities, and houses for their population. Players need to satisfy the needs of the town's residents and maintain their happiness ratings. As the player progresses, they will be able to unlock new buildings and technologies, as well as upgrading their workforce. The town's progress is measured via milestones, which is determined by the town's overall population.

Once the player has sufficient materials to repair their mining shaft, the second part of the game would be unlocked. In addition to building a functioning mine, players must recruit miners to explore an old abandoned mine to look for an ancient technology that may help the player to escape the planet. In the process, they must also collect ores and other resources which can be used for the expansion of the town. The miners need to be equipped with weapons as they will need to face monsters lurking inside the mine. A larger town will attract more engineers, allowing players to recruit more miners and expand the town's mining capabilities.

Development
SteamWorld Build is currently being developed by a team of 40 people in The Station, a studio owned by Thunderful Development, with franchise director Brjánn Sigurgeirsson overseeing its development. Build is the first SteamWorld game not developed by the original team in Sweden. The Station was previously known for developing art and assets for LittleBigPlanet games. Development of the game began in early 2020. Developers compared the game to the Anno series by Ubisoft and the Dungeon Keeper series from Bullfrog Productions, though the team strived to ensure that the game's two styles of gameplay are not independent of each other. The story of the game runs parallel to that of SteamWorld Dig 2 and features both new and returning characters from previous SteamWorld games.

In May 2022, Thunderful Development announced that they were working on four different SteamWorld games, with one of them being a city-building game codenamed "Coffee". The game was first announced in January 2023 by Thunderful as part of its "SteamWorld Telegraph" presentation. A free demo of the game was released on the same day. SteamWorld Build is set to be released for Windows PC, Nintendo Switch, PlayStation 4, PlayStation 5, Xbox One, Xbox Series X and Series S in 2023.

References

External links
 

Upcoming video games scheduled for 2023
SteamWorld
City-building games
Dungeon crawler video games
Windows games
PlayStation 4 games
PlayStation 5 games
Nintendo Switch games
Xbox One games
Xbox Series X and Series S games
Video games developed in Sweden
Single-player video games
Video games set on fictional planets
Video games about robots